Liolaemus gardeli is a species of lizard in the family  Liolaemidae. It is native to Uruguay.

References

gardeli
Reptiles described in 2017
Reptiles of Uruguay
Endemic fauna of Uruguay